"Precious Love" is a song by American singer-songwriter Bob Welch. It was released as a single in 1979 from his album Three Hearts.

The song is Welch's final Top 40 hit, peaking at #19 on the Billboard Hot 100.

Chart performance

References

1979 singles
1979 songs
Capitol Records singles
Songs written by Bob Welch (musician)
Bob Welch (musician) songs